Washington County School District may refer to.

Washington County School District (Alabama)
Washington County School District (Georgia)
Washington County School District (Florida)
Washington County School District (Utah)

See also

 
 
 Washington (disambiguation)
 Washington School (disambiguation)
 Washington County (disambiguation)
 Washington School District (disambiguation)